James I. Brumfield (born September 4, 1947) is a former American football running back who played one season for the Pittsburgh Steelers. Brumfield was drafted in the 10th round of the 244th pick in the 1970 NFL draft by the New Orleans Saints. He played college football at Indiana St. for the Indiana State Sycamores football team.

References

1947 births
Living people
American football running backs
Pittsburgh Steelers players
Indiana State Sycamores football players
Players of American football from Mississippi
People from Pike County, Mississippi